Parthenina feldi is a species of sea snail, a marine gastropod mollusk in the family Pyramidellidae, the pyrams and their allies.

Distribution
This marine species occurs off the following locations:
 Cape Verde

References

 Lygre F., Schander C., Kongsrud J.A. & Krakstad J.O. (2011) Three species of Parthenina (Chrysallidinae, Pyramidelloidea) new to West Africa. Journal of Conchology 40(4): 477-481 page(s): 478

External links
 To Encyclopedia of Life
 To World Register of Marine Species

Pyramidellidae
Gastropods of Cape Verde
Gastropods described in 2000